The girls' kumite +59 kg competition at the 2018 Summer Youth Olympics was held on 18 October at the Europa Pavilion in Buenos Aires, Argentina.

Schedule
All times are in local time (UTC-3).

Results

Elimination round

Pool A

Pool B

Semifinals

Final

References

External links

Summary

Karate at the 2018 Summer Youth Olympics
2018 in women's karate